The Heart of a Bandit is a 1915 American short silent Western film featuring Harry Carey.

Cast
 Harry Carey
 Claire McDowell
 Violet Reed (as Violet Reid)
 Charles West (as Charles H. West)

See also
 Harry Carey filmography

External links
 

1915 films
1915 short films
American silent short films
American black-and-white films
1915 Western (genre) films
Silent American Western (genre) films
1910s American films